Luzocephalus is an extinct genus of temnospondyl amphibian from the Early Triassic of Russia. It is usually regarded as a member of the family Lydekkerinidae, although it has also been placed in the family Trematosauridae.

References

Trematosaurines
Fossils of Russia
Triassic temnospondyls
Fossil taxa described in 1935